Elonzo was an independent rock band based out of Rock Hill, South Carolina area. In the heart of the Carolina Piedmont, they wrote songs about everyday life: sitting around on the front porch, watching the train go by, loss of loved ones, childhood, their hometown and their dreams. Elonzo's music represents some of the most classic elements of the Southeastern United States: earnestness, good story-telling, and an awareness of tragedy that never seems too far around the corner. 
The band's sound can transform from stripped alt-country to a richer, more expansive vision that reflects the meaningfulness of the ties that bind us together. Mostly, it sounds like rock and roll.

History
Elonzo is a family band- Jeremy Davis and Maggie Bourdeau are brother and sister and the heart of the band.  They grew up in Summerville, S.C., in a musical household. “We didn’t really play together, but we both always played music,” Davis says.  The siblings formed Elonzo in 2008 along with Maggie's husband, Dan Bourdeau. The band is named after the siblings’ father, who died in 1992.  The name was Dan's idea — Davis says using his father's name never crossed his mind.  They recorded and released their first album "All My Life" in 2008.  Bassist Dennis Contreras was added as they began playing live shows in the region, and in late 2009 they released a four-song ep titled simply "EP".  After that the band started working on their second full-length record "A Letter to a Friend", which was released in early 2011 to good reviews from local and regional critics.  Contreras left the band and was replaced by Stephen Narron, and they put out a holiday ep titled "Be Released (It's Christmas)" at the end of 2011.  Almost all of the tracks on these albums were recorded by Davis in his own house, and all were self-released.  Elonzo have become a staple in the South Carolina music scene and are currently recording a third full-length album, tracks from which are being released on the band's website as they are finished.  Some reviews have called their brand of rock "hard to pin down" but that's not what's important.  As Jeremy Davis says, "We are a rock and roll band. We drink whiskey. We are not a folk band, or a “insert genre” band. We are loud. We want to come to your town, and we love you".  
In December 2014, bassist Stephen Narron announced to the group that he would be moving to take up a job and would be leaving the band. At this point in the band's history, Maggie only being available part-time due to family, it seemed change was inevitable. With a longing to be able to hit the road to fully support his recorded efforts, Jeremy Davis announced in January 2015 that he would be continuing as a solo artist under the name Elonzo Wesley.

Band members

Current members
Jeremy Davis - vocals, guitar, harmonica
Maggie Davis Bourdeau - piano, vocals
Steven Narron - bass
Ben Haney - drums

Past members
Dennis Contreras - bass
Dan Bourdeau - drums

Session musicians
Justin Parrish - banjo
Anna Bullard - vocals
John Nipe - bells, mellotron, piano
Jason Poore - fiddle
Rodney Lanier - pedal steel
Hadley Eddings - vocals
Gentry Eddings - vocals
Jack Contreras - vocals

Discography

2008 All My Life
 The Train Song
 About Last Night
 Super South
 A Town in the Pines
 Forty Miles to Asheville
 Fool's Gold
 City Song
 Wine and Love
 I Am The Son
 Everyone Remembers
 All My Life
 612 E. White St.

2009 EP
 Sunday Morning
 Americana Blues
 Lucinda
 Say Nothing Do Nothing

2011 A Letter to a Friend
 Chosen One
 Living Will
 Fight Fight Fight
 El Rio
 Almost Home
 Cold Cold Heart
 I Think I Thought
 Dear Hunter
 Don't Be Downhearted
 Not A Promise

2011 Be Released (It's Christmas) EP
 Recession Proof
 Ghetto Reprise

2011 Salt on the Wound. Flesh on the Bone.''
 Reprise
 Ghost Coast
 Cannonfire Desire
 Shiny and New
 King to Your Queen
 Graveyard Love
 Free to Go
 Here it Comes
 Blinding Reminder

Recognitions
Best Live Shows of 2010
 # 3 in South Carolina's Best Albums of 2011
 # 6 in Reader's Choice Best SC Albums of 2011
Charlotte's Best Albums of 2011
Releases That Defined Our Region in 2011

References

External links

Elonzo on Reverb Nation

Musical groups established in 2008
Musical groups from South Carolina